The Dictionary of American Slang was edited by Stuart Flexner and Harold Wentworth and first published in 1960 by Thomas Crowell Company. The first three editions (1960, 1967, 1975) were edited by Flexner and Wentworth, while the fourth (1995) and fifth editions (2010) were largely reworked and edited by Barbara Ann Kipfer and Robert L. Chapman.

English professor Albert H. Marckwardt called the first edition a "highly useful work". He critiqued it for inconsistencies on what constitutes slang, but compared it favorably to Eric Partridge's Smaller Slang Dictionary because of the latter's lack of offensive terms. Linguistics professor Madeleine Mathiot criticized the exclusion of "fad" terms, which were omitted because the authors required two usages of a term separated by at least five years for it to be included.

The dictionary was banned from some schools in California in 1963 as part of larger concern with its potential obscenity, including concern from Los Angeles City Councilman John C. Holland. It was banned from certain schools in Colorado in 1981.

References 

Slang dictionaries
English dictionaries